The First Congregational Church in Platteville, Wisconsin was built in the Romanesque architecture style in 1869 and expanded in 1895. It was added to the National Register of Historic Places on June 19, 1985, for its architectural significance.

References

Churches on the National Register of Historic Places in Wisconsin
Churches in Grant County, Wisconsin
Congregational churches in Wisconsin
Romanesque Revival church buildings in Wisconsin
Churches completed in 1869
1869 establishments in Wisconsin
National Register of Historic Places in Grant County, Wisconsin